Crystal Gayle is the debut studio album by the American country music artist of the same name, although she had previously recorded material which was not released until later. It was released on February 7, 1975. The album peaked at #25 on the Billboard Country Albums chart, and included three charting Hot Country Singles: "Wrong Road Again" at #6, "Beyond You" at #27, and "This Is My Year for Mexico" at #21. 

Also included is her first rendition of "When I Dream," which would become a big hit three years later on the release of her 1978 album When I Dream. The recording of "Beyond You" is the same one that reappears on 1979's We Should Be Together. The song was later covered by Ava Barber, who included a version on her 1976 album Country as Grits. It was composed by Gayle and her then husband and manager, Bill Gatzimos.

Track listing

Personnel 
Crystal Gayle – vocals
Jimmy Colvard - electric and rhythm guitar
Allen Reynolds - rhythm guitar, backing vocals
Lloyd Green - steel guitar, dobro
Buddy Spicher - fiddle
Joe Allen - bass
Charles Cochrane - keyboards, string arrangements
Bobby Wood - keyboards
Jimmy Isbell, Kenny Malone - drums, percussion
Garth Fundis - baritone horn, backing vocals, engineer
Technical
Lloyd Ziff - art direction
Ria Lewerke - design
Doug Metzler - photography

References

Crystal Gayle albums
1975 debut albums
Albums produced by Allen Reynolds
United Artists Records albums